The 1993 AFL draft consisted of a mid-season draft, a national draft at the end of the season and a pre-season draft, held before the 1994 AFL season.

The AFL draft is the annual draft of new unsigned players by Australian rules football teams that participate in the main competition of that sport, the Australian Football League.

Clubs receive picks based on the position in which they finish on the ladder during the season, although these picks can be swapped around by teams for trading players.

This was the final season until 2019 during which a mid-season draft was conducted.

The 1993 National Draft was held on Friday, 29 October 1993, and was the first draft to be broadcast live on television.

1993 mid-season draft

1993 national draft

1994 pre-season draft

References

Australian Football League draft
Afl Draft, 1993
VFL Draft